Leyat, Automobiles Leyat was a French automobile manufacturer, established in 1919 in Paris by Marcel Leyat. 

The Hélica was known as 'The plane without wings'. The passengers sat behind each other as in an aircraft, and it was driven by a giant propeller powered by an  Scorpion engine. The body of the vehicle was made of plywood.

The factory was on the Quai de Grenelle in the 15th arrondissement.

Marcel Leyat

Marcel Leyat was an engineer, inventor, aviation pioneer, aeronautical and automobile manufacturer. (March 26, 1885 (Die, Drôme) - December 3, 1986.) He graduated from the École Centrale Paris in 1907. From 1908, he worked for the Société Astra and built a biplane glider called the Quand Quelle (When, which). He obtained the FAI pilot 's license in 1911. During the First World War, he built several aircraft, including a "living wing" bomber. In all, he designed and built around thirty different aircraft up to World War II.

Description

The first model was called Hélica, also known as 'The plane without wings'. The passengers sat behind each other as in an aircraft. The vehicle was steered using the rear wheels and the car was not powered by an engine turning the wheels, but by a giant propeller powered by an  Scorpion engine. The entire body of the vehicle was made of plywood, and weighed just 250 kg (550 lb), which made it dangerously fast.

Performance
Leyat continued to experiment with his Helica. He tried using propellers with two and four blades.

Production
Between 1919 and 1925, Leyat sold 30 vehicles.

Vehicle models
 1913: Helicocycle, 3 wheels, JAP engine, only one example
 1915: Hélicocycle, 3 wheels, version 2, only one copy
 1919: Hélica, 4 wheels, MAG engine, 6 examples
 1921: Leyat propeller car, 4 wheels, ABC engine, 10 sedan cars, 3 sport cabriolet cars
 1925: Rail/road draisine, intended for the director of mines in the Congo, 1 copy
 1927: Record model, 3 wheels, ABC engine, 1 copy. On September 7, 1927, it reached a speed of 170 km/h on the Montlhéry race track.

Gallery

References

Literature 

 G. N. Georgano: The Beaulieu Encyclopedia of the Automobile. Volume 2: G–O. Fitzroy Dearborn Publishers, Chicago 2001, ISBN 1-57958-293-1. 
 G. N. Georgano: Complete Automobile Encyclopedia. 1885 to Our Times. Courtille, Paris 1975.

External links 

Leyat Helicycle at 3wheelers.com
Helica image at goodwood-festival.com
The Marcel LEYAT's Helica at helica.info

Defunct motor vehicle manufacturers of France